The Kingdom of Bhutan is a small, landlocked nation nestled in the southern slopes of the Eastern Himalaya. To its north lies the Tibet Autonomous Region of China and to the west, south and east lies the Indian states of Sikkim, Bengal, Assam and Arunachal Pradesh.

The terrain is some of the most rugged in the world, characterised by huge variations in altitude. Within the 150 miles between the southern and northern borders, Bhutan's elevation rises from 150 to more than 7,500 metres. This great geographical diversity combined with equally diverse climate conditions contributes to Bhutan's outstanding range of biodiversity and ecosystems.

The tiger, one-horned rhino, golden langur, clouded leopard, hispid hare and the sloth bear live in the lush tropical lowland and hardwood forests in the south. In the temperate zone, grey langur, tiger, common leopard, goral and serow are found in mixed conifer, broadleaf and pine forests. Fruit bearing trees and bamboo provide habitat for the Himalayan black bear, red panda, squirrel, sambar, wild pig and barking deer. The alpine habitats of the great Himalayan range in the north are home to the snow leopard, blue sheep, marmot, antelope and Himalayan musk deer.

Flora and birds abound with more than 770 species of bird and 5,400 species of plants known to occur throughout the kingdom.

Conservation significance 
The Eastern Himalayas have been identified as a global biodiversity hotspot and counted among the 234 globally outstanding ecoregions of the world in a comprehensive analysis of global biodiversity undertaken by WWF between 2009-2021.

Bhutan is seen as a model for proactive conservation initiatives. The Kingdom has received international acclaim for its commitment to the maintenance of its biodiversity. This is reflected in the decision to maintain at least 12 of the land area under forest cover, to designate more than a quarter of its territory as national parks, reserves and other protected areas, and most recently to identify a further nine percent of land area as biodiversity corridors linking the protected areas.

Environmental conservation has been placed at the core of the nation's development strategy, the middle path. It is not treated as a sector but rather as a set of concerns that must be mainstreamed in Bhutan's overall approach to development planning and to be buttressed by the force of law.

Conservation issues 

Although Bhutan's natural heritage is still largely intact, the Government has rightly recognised that it cannot be taken for granted and that conservation of the natural environment must be considered one of the challenges that will need to be addressed in the years ahead.

Pressures on the natural environment are already evident and will be fuelled by a complex array of forces. They include population pressures, agricultural modernisation, poaching, large-scale hydro-power development, mineral extraction, industrialisation, urbanisation, sewage and waste disposal, tourism, competition for available land road construction and the provision of other physical infrastructure associated with social and economic development.

Policy implementation needs to be continually improved. Sustainable rural livelihoods that do not rely solely upon natural resource use need to be developed and supported, and there needs to be far wider understanding of the environmental threats that come hand in hand with development, to ensure the future of Bhutan's rich and diverse environment.

Fauna

Mammals: 

Argali
Asian elephant
Asiatic black bear
Golden langur
Binturong
Tiger
Dhole
Snow leopard
Bhutan takin
Gray wolf

Birds: 
Black-necked cranes in Bhutan

See also
Protected areas of Bhutan
Wildlife of India
Wildlife of Pakistan
Wildlife of Bangladesh
Wildlife of Sri Lanka
Wildlife of Myanmar (formerly Burma)

References

External links
 World Wildlife Federation (Bhutan)
 International Union for Conservation of Nature Red List
 “Online Photo Galleries” on Nature and Wildlife of India at "India Nature Watch (INW)" - spreading the love of nature and wildlife in India through photography

Biota of Bhutan
Bhutan